The name paravector is used for the combination of a scalar and a vector in any Clifford algebra, known as geometric algebra among physicists.

This name was given by J. G. Maks in a doctoral dissertation at Technische Universiteit Delft, Netherlands, in 1989.

The complete algebra of paravectors along with corresponding higher grade generalizations, all in the context of the Euclidean space of three dimensions, is an alternative approach to the spacetime algebra (STA) introduced by David Hestenes. This alternative algebra is called algebra of physical space (APS).

Fundamental axiom
For Euclidean spaces, the fundamental axiom indicates that the product of a vector with itself is the scalar value of the length squared (positive)

Writing 

and introducing this into the expression of the fundamental axiom

we get the following expression after appealing to the fundamental axiom again

which allows to
identify the scalar product of two vectors as

As an important consequence we conclude that two orthogonal vectors (with zero scalar product) anticommute

The three-dimensional Euclidean space
The following list represents an instance of a complete basis for the space,

which forms an eight-dimensional space, where the multiple indices indicate the product of the respective basis vectors, for example

The grade of a basis element is defined in terms of the vector multiplicity, such that
 

According to the fundamental axiom, two different basis vectors anticommute, 

or in other words,

This means that the volume element  squares to 

Moreover, the volume element  commutes with any other element of the  algebra, so that it can be identified with the complex number , whenever there is no danger of confusion. In fact, the volume element   along with the real scalar forms an algebra isomorphic to the standard complex algebra. The volume element can be used to rewrite an equivalent form of the
basis as

Paravectors
The corresponding paravector basis that combines a real scalar and vectors is

,

which forms a four-dimensional linear space. The paravector space in the three-dimensional Euclidean space  can be used to represent the space-time of special relativity as expressed in the algebra of physical space (APS).

the complete basis can be written in a compact form as

Antiautomorphism

Reversion conjugation
The action of this conjugation is to reverse the order of the geometric product (product between Clifford numbers in general).

,

where vectors and real scalar numbers are invariant under 
reversion conjugation and are said to be real, for example:

On the other hand, the trivector and bivectors change sign under reversion
conjugation and are said to be purely imaginary. The reversion conjugation applied to each basis element is given
below

Clifford conjugation
The Clifford Conjugation is denoted by a bar over the object 
. This conjugation is also called bar conjugation.

Clifford conjugation is the combined action of grade involution and reversion.

The action of the Clifford conjugation on a paravector is to reverse the sign of the
vectors, maintaining the sign of the real scalar numbers, for  example

This is due to both scalars and vectors being invariant to reversion ( it is impossible 
to reverse the order of one or no things ) and scalars are of zero order and so are of 
even grade whilst vectors are of odd grade and so undergo a sign change under grade involution.

As antiautomorphism, the Clifford conjugation is distributed as

The bar conjugation applied to each basis element is given
below

Note.- The volume element is invariant under the bar conjugation.

Grade automorphism
The grade automorphism

is defined as the composite action of both the reversion conjugation and Clifford conjugation and has the effect to invert the sign of odd-grade multivectors, while maintaining the even-grade multivectors invariant:

Invariant subspaces according to the conjugations
Four special subspaces can be defined in the  space
based on their symmetries under the reversion and Clifford conjugation

 Scalar subspace: Invariant under Clifford conjugation.
 Vector subspace: Reverses sign under Clifford conjugation.
 Real subspace: Invariant under reversion conjugation.
 Imaginary subspace: Reverses sign under reversion conjugation.

symmetric and antisymmetric combinations with the Clifford conjugation

.

by symmetric and antisymmetric combinations with the Reversion conjugation

.

It is possible to define four intersections, listed below

The following table summarizes the grades of the respective subspaces, where for example,
the grade 0 can be seen as the intersection of the Real and Scalar subspaces

Remark: The term "Imaginary" is used in the context of the  algebra and does not imply the introduction of the standard complex numbers in any form.

Closed subspaces with respect to the product 

There are two subspaces that are closed with respect to the product. They are the scalar space and the even space that are isomorphic with the well known algebras of complex numbers and quaternions.

 The scalar space made of grades 0 and 3 is isomorphic with the standard algebra of complex numbers with the identification of

 The even space, made of elements of grades 0 and 2, is isomorphic with the algebra of quaternions with the identification of

Scalar product

The magnitude square of a paravector  is

which is not a definite bilinear form and can be equal to zero even if the paravector is not equal to zero. 
 
It is very suggestive that the paravector space automatically obeys the metric of the Minkowski space
because

and in particular:

Biparavectors

defined as:

.

The biparavector basis can be written as

which contains six independent elements, including real and imaginary terms.
Three real elements (vectors) as 

and three imaginary elements (bivectors) as

where  run from 1 to 3.

In the Algebra of physical space,
the electromagnetic field is expressed as a biparavector as

where both the electric and magnetic fields are real vectors

and  represents the pseudoscalar volume element.

Another example of biparavector is the representation of the space-time rotation rate that can be expressed as

with three ordinary rotation angle variables  and three rapidities .

Triparavectors
defined as:

.

The triparavector basis can be written as

but there are only four independent triparavectors, so it can be reduced to

.

Pseudoscalar

The pseudoscalar basis is

but a calculation reveals that it contains only a single term. This term is the volume element .

The four grades, taken in combination of pairs generate the paravector, biparavector and triparavector spaces as shown in the next table, where for example, we see that the paravector is made of grades 0 and 1

Paragradient
The paragradient operator is the generalization of the gradient operator in the paravector space. The paragradient in the standard paravector basis is

which allows one to write the d'Alembert operator as

The standard gradient operator can be defined naturally as

so that the paragradient can be written as

where .

The application of the paragradient operator must be done carefully, always respecting its non-commutative nature. For example, a widely used derivative is 

where  is a scalar function of the coordinates.

The paragradient is an operator that always acts from the left if the function is a scalar function. However, if the function is not scalar, the paragradient can act from the right as well. For example, the following expression is expanded as

Null paravectors as projectors
Null paravectors are elements that are not necessarily zero but have magnitude identical to zero. For a null paravector , this property necessarily implies the following identity

In the context of Special Relativity they are also called lightlike paravectors.

Projectors are null paravectors of the form

where  is a unit vector.

A projector  of this form has a complementary projector 

such that

As projectors, they are idempotent

and the projection of one on the other is zero because they are null paravectors
 

The associated unit vector of the projector can be extracted as

this means that  is an operator
with eigenfunctions    and 
, with respective eigenvalues 

From the previous result, the following identity is valid assuming that  is analytic around zero

This gives origin to the pacwoman property, such that the following identities are satisfied

Null basis for the paravector space
A basis of elements, each one of them null, can be constructed for the complete 
 space. The basis of interest is the following

so that an arbitrary paravector

can be written as

This representation is useful for some systems that are naturally expressed in terms of the
 respectively.

Every expression in the paravector space can be written in terms of the null basis. A paravector  is in general parametrized by two real scalars numbers 
 and a general scalar number   (including scalar and pseudoscalar numbers)

the paragradient in the null basis is

Higher dimensions
An n-dimensional Euclidean space allows the existence of multivectors of grade n (n-vectors).

A given multivector with homogeneous grade is either invariant or changes sign under the action of the reversion conjugation . The elements that remain invariant are defined as Hermitian and those that change sign are defined as anti-Hermitian. Grades can thus be classified as follows:

Matrix representation
The algebra of the  space is isomorphic to the Pauli matrix algebra such that

from which the null basis elements become

A general Clifford number in 3D can be written as

where the coefficients  are scalar elements (including pseudoscalars). The indexes were chosen such that the representation of this Clifford number in terms of the Pauli matrices is

Conjugations
The reversion conjugation is translated into the Hermitian conjugation and the bar conjugation is translated into the following matrix:

such that the scalar part is translated as

The rest of the subspaces are translated as

Higher dimensions
The matrix representation of a Euclidean space in higher dimensions can be constructed in terms of the Kronecker product of the Pauli matrices, resulting in complex matrices of dimension . The 4D representation could be taken as

The 7D representation could be taken as

Lie algebras
Clifford algebras can be used to represent any classical Lie algebra.
In general it is possible to identify Lie algebras of compact groups by using anti-Hermitian elements, 
which can be extended to non-compact groups by adding Hermitian elements.

The bivectors of an n-dimensional Euclidean space are Hermitian elements and can be used to represent the  Lie algebra.

The bivectors of the three-dimensional Euclidean space form the   Lie algebra, which is isomorphic
to the  Lie algebra. This accidental isomorphism allows to picture a geometric interpretation of the
states of the two dimensional Hilbert space by using the Bloch sphere. One of those systems is the spin 1/2 particle.

The  Lie algebra can be extended by adding the three unitary vectors to form a Lie algebra isomorphic
to the  Lie algebra, which is the double cover of the Lorentz group  . This isomorphism 
in the form of the algebra of physical space.

There is only one additional accidental isomorphism between a spin Lie algebra and a  Lie algebra. This 

So, the 
 Lie algebra can be used to generate the  group. Despite that this group 
is smaller than the  group, it is seen to be enough to span the four-dimensional Hilbert space.

See also
 Algebra of physical space
 Dirac equation in the algebra of physical space

References

Textbooks
 Baylis, William (2002). Electrodynamics: A Modern Geometric Approach (2nd ed.). Birkhäuser. 
 Baylis, William, Clifford (Geometric) Algebras With Applications in Physics, Mathematics, and Engineering, Birkhauser (1999)
 [H1999] David Hestenes: New Foundations for Classical Mechanics (Second Edition). , Kluwer Academic Publishers (1999)
 Chris Doran and Antony Lasenby, Geometric Algebra for Physicists, Cambridge, 2003

Articles
  
 
 
 

Multilinear algebra
Clifford algebras
Geometric algebra